The International Symbol of Access (ISA), also known as the (International) Wheelchair Symbol, denotes areas where access has been improved, mostly for those with disabilities. It consists of a usually blue square overlaid in white (or in contrasting colours) with a stylized image of a person in a wheelchair. It is maintained as an international standard, ISO 7001 image of the International Commission on Technology and Accessibility (ICTA), a committee of Rehabilitation International (RI).

History
The ISA was designed by Danish design student Susanne Koefoed in 1968. It was first sketched at a radical design conference mounted by the Scandinavian Students Organization (SDO). The group organized a summer study session at Stockholm's art and design college, Konstfack, alternating time between workshop sessions and larger lectures. In these lectures, the tone was set by the American designer and educator Victor Papanek. In the writings that he formulated during this period, too, he imagined persons who were disabled—both physically and mentally—as figures in need of renewed attention. Although there is no evidence that Papanek met Koefoed, his influence pervaded the seminar where the original ISA was drafted. Charged with creating a sign-symbol to mark barrier-free accommodations, Koefoed presented an early version of the symbol at the July 1968 exhibition held at the SDO seminar's end. Koefoed's symbol depicts an empty wheelchair. This icon was widely promoted around Sweden the following year.

Karl Montan, director of Sweden's new Handicapped Institute, also promoted Koefoed's design to Rehabilitation International. Montan worked to develop a symbol specifically as a technical aid Head of RI's International Commission of Technology and Accessibility (ICTA), Montan was asked by RI to form a special committee that would find and deliver a symbol to the group's 1969 convention in Dublin. Montan's group was asked to choose from six symbols. When Koefoed's symbol was presented, several members complained that it was too austere and illegible. As Montan noted: "a slight inconvenience with the symbol is the equally thick lines, which may give an impression of a monogram of letters. With a 'head' on the symbol this inconvenience would disappear." Taking the original copy of the design, Montan would add a circle to the top of the seat to give the impression of a seated figure.

Functions

The symbol is often seen where access has been improved, particularly for wheelchair users, but also for other disability issues. Frequently, the symbol denotes the removal of environmental barriers, such as steps, which also helps older people, parents with baby carriages, and travellers. Universal design aims to obviate such symbols by creating products and facilities that are accessible to nearly all users from the start. The wheelchair symbol is "International" and therefore not accompanied by Braille in any particular language.

Specific uses of the ISA include:
Marking a parking space reserved for vehicles used by people with disabilities/blue badge holders
Marking a vehicle used by a person with a disability, often for permission to use a space
Marking a public lavatory with facilities designed for wheelchair users 
Indicating a button to activate an automatic door
Indicating an accessible transit station or vehicle
Indicating a transit route that uses accessible vehicles

The ISA is assigned the Unicode code point , showing as ♿︎

A compatible font such as DejaVu Sans must be installed to view the character. 

Building codes such as the California Building Code, require "a white figure on a blue background. The blue shall be equal to Color No. 15090 in Federal Standard 595B."

Modified ISA

Some disability activists are advocating for a modified access symbol. Sara Hendren and Brian Glenney co-founded the Accessible Icon project, designing the new icon to display an active, engaged image with focus on the person with disability. Some disability organizations such as Enabling Unit in India are promoting it, This version of the symbol is officially used in the U.S. states of New York and Connecticut. The Modified ISA is in the permanent collection of Museum of Modern Art. According to Emma Teitel of the Toronto Star, critics say that the modified image would still socially stigmatize those who have a disability but do not use a wheelchair.

In May 2015, the Federal Highway Administration rejected the new design for use on road signs in the United States, citing the fact that it has not been adopted or endorsed by the U.S. Access Board, the agency responsible for developing the federal criteria for accessible design. The International Organization for Standardization, which established the regular use of the original symbol under ISO 7001, has also rejected the design.

References

External links
  An episode of the 99% Invisible podcast on the Accessible Icon Project.

Symbols
Accessibility
Symbols introduced in 1968
Danish inventions
ISO standards